Jonathan Henry Bond (born 19 May 1993) is an English professional footballer who plays as a goalkeeper for Major League Soccer club LA Galaxy. Bond has played internationally for Wales at under-17 and under-19 levels; he has also been called up to the under-21 and senior teams and the England under-21 squad having chosen to change his international allegiance in 2013.

Club career

Watford 
Educated at Berkhamsted School, Bond came through the academy system at Watford featuring in the youth and reserve teams at Vicarage Road. During the 2010–11 season Bond featured on the substitutes bench for Watford several times as cover for the injured Rene Gilmartin and also spent time on loan at Brackley Town.

In August 2011, Bond again joined Brackley Town on loan to receive some playing experience. On his return to Watford, Bond was again sent out on loan to Conference National side Forest Green Rovers on 4 November 2011 for a month. Bond made his Forest Green debut the next day in a 4–1 win against Alfreton Town. In total Bond made four appearances for Forest Green in his loan spell and was recalled a week early by Watford.

On his return to Watford, Bond acted as deputy goalkeeper to Scott Loach on the substitutes bench in the Championship and on 2 January 2012 made his first team debut replacing Loach who had been sent off in a 2–0 loss against Portsmouth at Fratton Park.

On 23 February 2012, Bond joined League Two side Dagenham & Redbridge on a monthlong loan deal. He then joined Bury on loan until the end of the season and made his debut in the 3–0 defeat at Brentford on 7 April.

After starting Watford's FA Cup defeat to Manchester City on 5 January 2013, Bond made his home league debut in a 2–1 win over Derby County on 23 February 2013 after coming on for the injured Manuel Almunia. Bond made his first league start against Wolverhampton Wanderers on 1 March 2013. He then continued to deputise with starts against Sheffield Wednesday on 5 March 2013, Blackpool on 9 March 2013, Barnsley on 16 March 2013 and once more versus Burnley on 29 March 2013 – all in place of the injured Almunia. With Almunia not back to fitness, Bond made his sixth consecutive start on 2 April 2013 against Hull City in a 1–0 win, keeping his first clean sheet in a man of the match performance.

Bond deputised in the final league game of the season against Leeds United on 4 May 2013 after Almunia was injured in the warm-up. Bond then suffered a serious injury of his own after a horrible collision with Ikechi Anya and Dominic Poleon which forced him off on a stretcher.

Reading 
On Saturday 4 July 2015, Bond signed for Reading on a three-year deal from Watford for an undisclosed fee.

Loan spells 
On 26 August 2016, Bond joined Gillingham on loan until 7 January 2017.

On 26 June 2017 Bond joined Peterborough United on a six-month loan, extending the loan until the end of the season on 3 January 2018.

West Bromwich Albion 
On 16 July 2018, Bond joined newly relegated West Bromwich Albion on a two-year contract as a free agent. Bond served as back-up to first-choice keeper Sam Johnstone as the club lost in the 2018-19 EFL Championship play-offs in the semi-finals to rivals Aston Villa. However, they bounced back the following year to finish as runners-up in the 2019-20 EFL Championship, gaining promotion back to the Premier League. Bond was released from the club after his contract ended on 1 August 2020. Albion re-signed Bond on a one-year deal before the start of the 2020–21 Premier League season.

LA Galaxy 
On 14 January 2021, Bond moved to the United States to sign with Major League Soccer side LA Galaxy.

International career
Bond has made international appearances for Wales at under-17 level, and scored an 88th minute equalising goal in Wales' 2–1 Uefa Under-17 Championship qualifying match against Russia in October 2009. He later progressed to under-19 level, and has been called up to under-21 squads. In 2010, aged 17, Bond was called up to the full Wales squad for two Euro 2012 qualifying matches, although he did not play in the games.

In spite of his caps for Wales, the FAW stated on 19 July 2013 that Bond had chosen to transfer to the English national pool and was called into the English under-21 squad in August 2013. He made his debut for the England under-21s on 19 November, replacing Jack Butland at half-time in a 9–0 win against San Marino.

Career statistics

References

External links

Football Association profile

1993 births
Association football goalkeepers
Brackley Town F.C. players
Bury F.C. players
Dagenham & Redbridge F.C. players
England under-21 international footballers
English footballers
English people of Welsh descent
National League (English football) players
Footballers from Hertfordshire
Sportspeople from Hemel Hempstead
Forest Green Rovers F.C. players
Living people
Reading F.C. players
West Bromwich Albion F.C. players
Peterborough United F.C. players
LA Galaxy players
English Football League players
Wales youth international footballers
Watford F.C. players
Welsh footballers
Major League Soccer players